is a Japanese tennis player. He has won three ATP Challenger Tour singles titles and achieved a career-high singles ranking of world No. 143 on 5 January 2015.

Tennis career

Juniors
As a junior, Moriya compiled a singles win–loss record of 76–37, reaching as high as No. 17 in the junior combined world rankings in October 2008.

Junior Grand Slam results:

Australian Open: 3R (2007, 2008)
French Open: Q1 (2007)
Wimbledon: 1R (2008)
US Open: Q2 (2006)

2008-11
Moriya had won three ITF Futures events in Japan and Chinese Taipei. He also had participated in a number of ATP Challenger Tour events, winning some matches of those tournaments. He ended 2011 as ranked world no. 327.

2012: Major debut, First ATP win
Moriya failed to qualify for French Open and Wimbledon, but he qualified for the 2012 US Open to make his Grand Slam main draw debut, losing to Ivan Dodig in the first round.

During the Asian hardcourt swing, he defeated Robin Haase in the Thailand Open to record his first ATP main draw win, and played a close match against Stanislas Wawrinka at the Japan Open, losing 5–7, 6–4, 4–6. In November, Moriya reached his first ATP Challenger Tour final in Toyota, where he lost to Michał Przysiężny in straight sets.

2013: Davis Cup debut
He represented Japan for the first time in his career at the 2013 Davis Cup Asia/Oceania Zone Group I against South Korea. He played the doubles rubber with Yasutaka Uchiyama and Japan advanced into the World Group Play-offs.

Moriya was the runner-up of Shanghai Challenger, losing to his countryman Yuichi Sugita in the final, and he made quarterfinals or better of Asian Challenger events in this year.

2014: First Challenger title and Top 150
In Australian hard court season, Moriya reached the final in the Burnie Challenger for the third time at this level and the semifinal in West Lakes.

Moriya won his first challenger title, winning the $50,000+H Granby Challenger event in Canada by beating Fabrice Martin in the final. Following this tournament, he entered the ATP rankings top 150. In the Asian swing, Moriya competed in the ATP events of Kuala Lumpur and Tokyo, both losing in the first round.

2015: Second ATP win
In the 2015 Australian Open, despite losing of the qualifying round, Moriya entered into main draw as lucky loser replacing Juan Martín del Potro. He was eliminated in the first round by Jerzy Janowicz with four sets. 

He won through the qualifying at the 2015 Wimbledon Championships, dropping just one set, but lost to ninth seed and reigning US Open champion Marin Čilić in the opening round. In September, Moriya reached the second round of the Shenzhen Open, beating Ričardas Berankis in straight sets. He lost to third seed Tommy Robredo.

2022: First ATP 500 level win
During the Asian hardcourt swing, Moriya entered the 2022 Korea Open and the 2022 Rakuten Japan Open Tennis Championships after qualifying for the singles main draw as a lucky loser. In the latter he defeated compatriot fellow qualifier Yuta Shimizu for his first ATP 500 and Tokyo Open win. As a result he moved 40 positions up the rankings into the top 250.

Challenger and Futures/World Tennis Tour finals

Singles: 25 (10–15)

Doubles: 8 (3–5)

References

External links

 Official blog 

Japanese male tennis players
1990 births
Living people
21st-century Japanese people